The Samsung NX30 is a DSLR-style mirrorless camera, part of Samsung's NX series announced by Samsung on January 2, 2014. It is the successor of the Samsung NX20.

The NX30 is visually similar to its predecessor, the Samsung NX20, but is more advanced and has a fast hybrid autofocus which Samsung claims can detect an object in only 80ms. Another significant changes are a much more powerful processor which makes the camera far more responsible and faster, a much larger body with very good ergonomics, better video quality and capability (Full HD 60 fps, and a better codec), enhanced wifi connectivity, touch sensitive flexible display, and a large fast viewfinder with unique tilt construction.

Although nearly the same sensor was used, the NX30 has improved ISO range, the older sensor lacks a bit against modern competitors on high sensitivity but is capable of delivering very detailed images with Samsung lenses. This model was a much needed improvement after the somehow sluggish NX20, with only minor negatives, and the price was dramatically lowered after some time.

References

http://www.dpreview.com/products/samsung/slrs/samsung_nx30/specifications

NX30
Live-preview digital cameras